Henry S. Horn (November 12, 1941 – March 14, 2019) was a natural historian and ecologist.  He was an emeritus professor in the Ecology and Evolutionary Biology Department at Princeton University. He worked on a wide variety of topics including the following:
 the geometrical structure of forests
 patterns of forest succession
 wind dispersal of seeds
 spatial patterns of competition
 social behavior of butterflies

Education
He completed his Bachelor of Arts at Harvard University in 1962 and his Doctor of Philosophy at the University of Washington in 1966. He wrote his Ph.D. thesis about the adaptive nature of the social behavior of blackbirds.

He was one of several scientists to have proposed the intermediate disturbance hypothesis.

References

Books
Horn, H.S. (1971) The Adaptive Geometry of Trees Princeton University Press.

External links
 Faculty Profile

1941 births
2019 deaths
20th-century American biologists
American ecologists
Harvard University alumni
Scientists from Philadelphia
Princeton University faculty
University of Washington alumni